Simon Christopher Danczuk (born 24 October 1966) is a British author and former Member of Parliament (MP) who represented the constituency of Rochdale between 2010 and 2017. He has co-written two books, Smile for the Camera: The Double Life of Cyril Smith and Scandal at Dolphin Square.

Early life and career
Danczuk grew up in Hapton, Lancashire. He began his working life at the age of sixteen in a factory making gas fires, before moving to the chemical company ICI. Whilst working, he studied at night school and gained qualifications he had missed at secondary school. He then gained a place as a mature student at Lancaster University where he studied Economic Sociology and Politics.

Danczuk became involved in the Labour movement after joining the Labour Party through the GMB trade union in the late 1980s. In 1993, at the age of 27, he was elected as a councillor to Blackburn with Darwen Borough Council and served for six years, with portfolios including economic development and education.

In 1999 Danczuk became the founding director of a research, public affairs and communications consultancy called Vision Twentyone alongside Ruth Turner, who would later become Director of Government Relations within Tony Blair's Downing Street office. He held this position until his election to Parliament in 2010.  Danczuk also has held research positions at The Big Issue in the North, Opinion Research Corporation, Bolton Bury TEC and worked for academics at Lancaster University.

Danczuk founded the Necessary Group, a campaign group of businessmen and politicians which campaigned prior to the expected referendums for an elected Regional Assembly for the North West of England.

Danczuk was selected in early 2007 to be the Rochdale Labour Party's Prospective Parliamentary Candidate. He received death threats during the selection process, including a funeral wreath with flowers spelling 'Simon' and a four-foot cross being anonymously sent to his work office.

Parliamentary career
Danczuk was first elected to Parliament in the 2010 general election. He unseated incumbent Liberal Democrat Paul Rowen and secured a majority of 889 votes. Danczuk won the seat for Labour despite a microphone picking up Prime Minister Gordon Brown calling Rochdale resident Gillian Duffy a "bigoted woman" on a visit to the constituency during the campaign.

In May 2011, Danczuk made a criminal complaint to Essex Police about Liberal Democrat MP and Secretary of State for Energy and Climate Change, Chris Huhne, after it was alleged that Huhne had asked his wife, economist Vicky Pryce, to take his penalty points for a speeding offence in 2003. On 3 February 2012, Huhne became the first Cabinet Minister in British political history to be forced from office as a result of criminal proceedings. Huhne was later tried and imprisoned, as was Vicky Pryce.

Danczuk was re-elected as the Labour Party MP for Rochdale at the 2015 general election, substantially increasing his majority from 889 to 12,442 over the second-placed UKIP candidate.

Danczuk was critical of Jeremy Corbyn's leadership of the party following his election as leader on 12 September 2015. The Financial Times described him as Corbyn's "most outspoken internal critic".

Danczuk was particularly active investigating historical allegations of child abuse against politicians. His campaigning attracted significant media attention and as a result he was one of the most high-profile backbench MPs. In March 2014 Smile for the Camera: The Double Life of Cyril Smith was published, an exposé of child sexual abuse committed by former Rochdale MP Cyril Smith, written by Danczuk along with researcher and campaigner Matthew Baker. The book was serialised in the Daily Mail and was named Political Book of the Year for 2014 by the Sunday Times.

Independent Inquiry into Child Sexual Abuse (IICSA) 

 
During a Home Affairs Select Committee hearing in July 2014, Danczuk called for Leon Brittan, Home Secretary between 1983 and 1985, to make public what he knew about a dossier of allegations against politicians presented to him by Geoffrey Dickens (1931 – 1995, MP until 1995), which could identify several historic child sex abusers. The Home Office stated the dossier had not been retained in their files. Former Director of Public Prosecutions Lord Macdonald said the circumstances in which the dossier had gone missing were alarming, and recommended an inquiry into what happened.

Prime Minister David Cameron subsequently asked the Home Office Permanent Secretary to investigate what happened to the missing dossier. The same month, Danczuk wrote to the Director of Public Prosecutions asking for a review of the decision not to investigate certain historical allegations of sexual abuse made against senior Westminster politicians.

Danczuk's investigation significantly contributed to the decision of the government to set up the Independent Inquiry into Child Sexual Abuse, a statutory inquiry under the Inquiries Act 2005, which opened on 9 July 2015. During the investigation it was revealed that former Liberal Party leader David Steel learned about Cyril Smith's behaviour in 1979 but did nothing about it, and later nominated him for a knighthood. As a result, on 25 February 2020 he resigned from the Liberal Democrats and resigned from the House of Lords on 27 March 2020.

For his investigative work on child abuse, Danczuk was named 'Campaigner of the Year' by the Political Studies Association in November 2014 and won the Contrarian Prize in June 2015.

Suspension by the Labour party and resignation 
In December 2015, Danczuk's membership of the Labour Party was suspended following reports he had exchanged explicit messages with a 17-year-old girl.   Danczuk apologised for his behaviour, which he described as "inappropriate and stupid", and said the incident occurred during an extremely low point of his life after his second marriage had collapsed. Danczuk was not found to have broken the law and was not expelled from the party, but the National Executive Committee of the Labour Party ruled that he would not be endorsed as a Labour Party candidate for the snap 2017 United Kingdom general election. He resigned from the party in May 2017 and contested Rochdale as an independent candidate where came in fifth place as Labour Party candidate Tony Lloyd won the seat. After the result, he said that he would not stand for election again.

Personal life 
Danczuk has been married twice. Both marriages ended in divorce, and he has two children from each marriage.

Books by Simon Danczuk
 Danczuk, Simon and Baker, Matthew (2014). Smile for the Camera: The Double Life of Cyril Smith. Biteback Publishing. . Extract
 Danczuk, Simon and Smith, Daniel (2022). Scandal at Dolphin Square. The History Press Ltd. .

References

External links 

1966 births
21st-century English male writers
Alumni of Lancaster University
Alumni of Cartmel College, Lancaster
Councillors in Lancashire
English male non-fiction writers
English non-fiction writers
English people of Polish descent
Independent members of the House of Commons of the United Kingdom
Labour Party (UK) MPs for English constituencies
Living people
Members of the Parliament of the United Kingdom for Rochdale
People from Rochdale
Political sex scandals in the United Kingdom
Sexual abuse victim advocates
UK MPs 2010–2015
UK MPs 2015–2017